Yongmun Station is a station of Daejeon Metro Line 1 in Yongmun-dong, Jung District, Daejeon, South Korea. It is located between Ohryong Station and Tanbang Station of Daejeon City Railway Line 1. This station is located across the Yudeung Stream from Ohryong Station.

Surroungdings 
Apartment complexes and residential areas are located in the vicinity of the Yongmun Station, and there are nearby Hanmin Traditional Market and Highland Fish Market.

References

External links
  Yongmun Station from Daejeon Metropolitan Express Transit Corporation

Daejeon Metro stations
Jung District, Daejeon
Railway stations opened in 2006